In 1881, Detroit Mayor William G. Thompson bought most of the players from the defunct Cincinnati Reds franchise and formed the Detroit Wolverines, which joined the National League. The team finished the season with a 41–43 record, good enough for fourth place in the NL race.

Regular season

Season standings

Record vs. opponents

Roster

Player stats

Batting

Starters by position
Note: Pos = Position; G = Games played; AB = At bats; H = Hits; Avg. = Batting average; HR = Home runs; RBI = Runs batted in

Other batters
Note: G = Games played; AB = At bats; H = Hits; Avg. = Batting average; HR = Home runs; RBI = Runs batted in

Pitching

Starting pitchers
Note: G = Games pitched; IP = Innings pitched; W = Wins; L = Losses; ERA = Earned run average; SO = Strikeouts

References
1881 Detroit Wolverines season at Baseball Reference

Detroit Wolverines seasons
Detroit Wolverines season
Detroit Wolv
1880s in Detroit